Łopatki may refer to the following places:
Łopatki, Wąbrzeźno County in Kuyavian-Pomeranian Voivodeship (north-central Poland)
Łopatki, Włocławek County in Kuyavian-Pomeranian Voivodeship (north-central Poland)
Łopatki, Łódź Voivodeship (central Poland)
Łopatki, Lublin Voivodeship (east Poland)